Persatuan Sepakbola Lombok Timur (simply known as Perslotim) is an Indonesian football club based in East Lombok, West Nusa Tenggara. They currently compete in the Liga 3.

Honours 
 Liga 3 West Nusa Tenggara
 Champions: 2018

References

External links 
 

Sport in West Nusa Tenggara
Football clubs in Indonesia
Football clubs in West Nusa Tenggara